Jonas Bergman (born 1995) was a Finnish painter.

Bergman was born in Turku. He married Ulrika Lang on 19 October 1749. She was the daughter of the church painter Claes Lang. Bergman primarily painted pulpit and altarpieces, including works in the following churches: Sottunga (1753), Paimio (1755), Nummi (1759), Föglö (1759), Alastaro and Rymättylä (1766).

References
 Profit Ahonen, church painter Claes Lang steps Genos 63 (1992), pp. 42–49, 60 Subsequent 29/06/2008
 Some content translated from corresponding Finnish Wikipedia website

1724 births
1810 deaths
People from Turku
18th-century Finnish painters
18th-century male artists
Finnish male painters
19th-century Finnish painters
19th-century Finnish male artists